The Rifle, Number 8 (commonly referred to as the "Number 8 Rifle" or the "Number 8 Cadet Rifle") is a bolt-action .22 calibre version of the Lee–Enfield rifle designed for British Army target shooting. They are simple single-shot, hand-fed cadet rifles and were originally designed to be used by military marksmen firing in civilian competitions. The Number 8 is no longer used by the British cadet services as a basic target rifle, replaced by the L144 and air rifles. Some examples are in civilian ownership worldwide, especially following the disposal by the New Zealand cadet forces of their Number 8 and Number 9 rifles at auction.

Sight types 
A harmonisation setting is also provided for firing at specially designed targets. The No 8 can also be fitted with two types of sight. The more common leaf sight, allowing adjustment for elevation only, is simpler to use and more robust, but the standard of accuracy that can be achieved with this sight is lower than can be achieved with the Parker Hale PH5D sight, which allows for windage adjustment as well as elevation, in 1/4 minute-of-angle clicks. It is also more delicate than the leaf-sight and not generally found in cadet service. The Parker-Hale 8/53 sight adaptor unit can also be fitted to the leaf rearsight, providing windage adjustment without the removal of the issued sighting system. It screws on through the sight aperture and therefore introduces a large elevation difference, rendering the range markings on the sight useless.

Replacement
In 2014 the replacement contract for the rifle was put out to tender.  In 2016 it was announced that a modified version of the Savage Arms FVT had been chosen for this role, entering service as the "L144 A1 Cadet Small Bore Target Rifle (CSBTR)".

Users

 Sea Cadet Corps
 Combined Cadet Force
 Air Training Corps

References

Lee-Enfield Rifle No.8
Single-shot bolt-action rifles
Rifles of the United Kingdom
.22 LR rifles